Milan Majstorović (born 21 February 2005) is a Serbian football player who plays as a centre-back for Russian club Dynamo Moscow.

Club career
On 17 August 2022, Majstorović signed a contract with Russian Premier League club Dynamo Moscow, beginning in February 2023. He made his RPL debut for Dynamo on 11 March 2023 in a game against Krasnodar.

International career
Majstorović represented Serbia at the 2022 UEFA European Under-17 Championship, where they reached the semi-finals.

Career statistics

References

External links
 
 

2005 births
Footballers from Novi Sad
Living people
Serbian footballers
Serbia youth international footballers
Association football defenders
FK Vojvodina players
FC Dynamo Moscow players
Russian Premier League players
Serbian expatriate footballers
Expatriate footballers in Russia
Serbian expatriate sportspeople in Russia